The 1993 Challenge Cup was the 92nd staging of rugby league's oldest knockout competition, the Challenge Cup. Known as the Silk Cut Challenge Cup for sponsorship reasons, the final was contested by Wigan and Widnes at Wembley. Wigan won the match 20–14. This the first time that the final had been contested by 2 teams who had played in the preliminary round and this was the last time that the preliminary round would be played

Preliminary round

First round

Second round

Quarter-finals

Semi finals

Final

References

External links
Challenge Cup official website 
Challenge Cup 1992/93 results at Rugby League Project

Challenge Cup
Challenge Cup